Saint Sava II (1201–1271) was the third archbishop of the Serbian Orthodox Church, serving from 1263 until his death in 1271. He was the middle son of King Stefan the First-Crowned of the Nemanjić dynasty and his Byzantine wife Eudokia Angelina. He had two brothers, Stefan Radoslav and Stefan Vladislav, and a sister, Komnena. Predislav took the monastic name of Sava, after his uncle, Saint Sava, the first Serbian archbishop. The Serbian Orthodox Church celebrates him as a saint and his feast-day is 21 February.

Born as Predislav in  1198, he was the middle son of King Stefan the First-Crowned and Eudokia Angelina. He had brothers Stefan Radoslav (b. 1192), Stefan Vladislav (b. 1198), and half-brother Stefan Uroš I (b. 1223). He also had two sisters, Komnena being the only one whose name is known.

King Stefan the First-Crowned, who had become ill, took monastic vows and died in 1227. Radoslav who was the eldest son succeeded as King, crowned at Žiča by Archbishop Sava, his uncle. The younger sons, Vladislav and Uroš I, received appanages. Sava II (Predislav) was appointed bishop of Hum shortly thereafter, later serving as archbishop of Serbia (1263-1270). The Church and state was thus dominated by the same family and the ties between the two as well as the family's role within the Church continued.

See also
List of heads of the Serbian Orthodox Church

References

Sources

External links

Archbishops of Serbs
13th-century Serbian people
13th-century Christian saints
13th-century Eastern Orthodox bishops
Serbian saints of the Eastern Orthodox Church
Eastern Orthodox Christians from Serbia
Bishops of Zahumlje-Herzegovina
Medieval Athos
1201 births
1271 deaths
Saint Sava
People of the Kingdom of Serbia (medieval)
Burials at the Patriarchate of Peć (monastery)
Nemanjić dynasty